Telok Blangah Single Member Constituency was a single member constituency (SMC) in Singapore. The constituency was formed in 1959 and was abolished in 1991.

History 
In 1959, the Telok Blangah Constituency was formed. In 1988, it was renamed as Telok Blangah Single Member Constituency as part of Singapore's political reforms. In 1991, it was abolished and merged into West Coast Group Representation Constituency.

Member of Parliament

Elections

Elections in the 1950s

Elections in 1960s

Elections in 1970s

Elections in 1980s

References

Singaporean electoral divisions
Telok Blangah